Alexandria the Great is the third studio album by the American jazz singer Lorez Alexandria.

Track listing 
 "Show Me" (Alan Jay Lerner, Frederick Loewe) – 4:05
 "I've Never Been in Love Before" (Frank Loesser) – 2:20
 "Satin Doll" (Duke Ellington, Johnny Mercer, Billy Strayhorn) – 2:47
 "My One and Only Love" (Robert Mellin, Guy Wood) – 4:30
 "Over the Rainbow" (Harold Arlen, Yip Harburg) – 3:59
 "Get Me to the Church on Time" (Lerner, Loewe) – 4:03
 "The Best Is Yet to Come" (Cy Coleman, Carolyn Leigh) – 2:46
 "I've Grown Accustomed to His Face" (Lerner, Loewe) – 4:07
 "Give Me the Simple Life" (Rube Bloom, Harry Ruby) – 2:23
 "I'm Through With Love" (Gus Kahn, Jay Livingston, Matty Malneck) – 5:25

Personnel 
 Lorez Alexandria – vocals, liner notes, finger snaps
 Tutti Camarata – producer, original recording producer
 Paul Chambers – bass
 Jimmy Cobb – drums
 Ray Crawford – guitar
 Victor Feldman – piano, vibraphone
 Paul Horn – flute, alto sax
 Wynton Kelly – piano
 Al McKibbon – bass
 Bud Shank – flute

Credits 
 Bill Marx – arranger
 Ken Druker – executive producer
 Mark Cooper Smith – production assistant
 Sherniece Smith – art producer
 Bob Thiele – producer, liner notes
 Hideaki Nishimura – mastering
 Hollis King – art direction
 Bryan Koniarz – producer
 Joe Lebow – liner design
 Roger Marshutz – photography, cover photo
 Robert Flynn – cover design

References 

1964 albums
Lorez Alexandria albums
Impulse! Records albums
Albums produced by Bob Thiele